Milan Stegnjajić (born 19 August 1962) is a Yugoslav retired footballer.

Career 
Milan Stegnjajić started playing football in his hometown Benkovac for the local club Velebit which played in lower leagues. Good displays as defender earned him transfers to bigger clubs, first to NK Zadar in the Yugoslav Second League in 1984, and then, from 1986 till 1992 he will play in the Yugoslav First League with FK Sloboda Tuzla, FK Spartak Subotica and FK Borac Banja Luka.

Sources

1962 births
Living people
People from Benkovac
Association football defenders
Yugoslav footballers
NK Zadar players
FK Sloboda Tuzla players
FK Spartak Subotica players
FK Borac Banja Luka players
Yugoslav Second League players
Yugoslav First League players